Mongolia competed at the 2020 Summer Olympics in Tokyo. Originally scheduled to take place from 24 July to 9 August 2020, the Games were postponed to 23 July to 8 August 2021, because of the COVID-19 pandemic. Since the nation's debut in 1964, Mongolian athletes have appeared in every edition of the Summer Olympic Games, with the exception of the 1984 Summer Olympics in Los Angeles, because of its support of the Soviet boycott.

Medalists

Competitors
The following is the list of number of competitors in the Games.

Archery

One Mongolian archer qualified for the men's individual recurve by reaching the quarterfinal stage and obtaining one of the three available spots at the 2019 Asian Archery Championships in Bangkok, Thailand. Another Mongolian archer scored a fourth-round triumph to book the last of six available spots in the women's individual recurve at the 2021 Final Qualification Tournament in Paris, France.

Athletics

Mongolian athletes further achieved the entry standards, either by qualifying time or by world ranking, in the following track and field events (up to a maximum of 3 athletes in each event):

Track & road events

Basketball

Summary

3×3 basketball

Women's tournament

Mongolia women's national 3x3 team qualified directly for the Olympics by securing an outright berth, as one of the four highest-ranked squads, in the women's category of the FIBA rankings.

Team roster
Enkhtaivan Chimeddolgor
Onolbaatar Khulan
Bayasgalan Solongo
Munkhsaikhan Tserenlkham

Group play

Boxing 

Mongolia entered one male boxer into the Olympic tournament. Rio 2016 Olympian Baatarsükhiin Chinzorig scored an outright quarterfinal victory to reserve a spot in the men's lightweight division at the 2020 Asia & Oceania Qualification Tournament in Amman, Jordan. Baartarsükhiin's teammate Erdenebatyn Tsendbaatar (men's lightweight) and Mönkhbatyn Myagmarjargal (women's middleweight) completed the nation's boxing lineup by topping the list of eligible boxers from Asia and Oceania in their respective weight divisions of the IOC's Boxing Task Force Rankings.

Judo
 
Mongolia entered 12 judoka into the Olympic tournament based on the International Judo Federation Olympics Individual Ranking.

Men

Women

Mixed

Shooting

Mongolian shooters achieved quota places for the following events by virtue of their best finishes at the 2018 ISSF World Championships, the 2019 ISSF World Cup series, and Asian Championships, as long as they obtained a minimum qualifying score (MQS) by May 31, 2020.

Swimming

Mongolia received a universality invitation from FINA to send two top-ranked swimmers (one per gender) in their respective individual events to the Olympics, based on the FINA Points System of June 28, 2021.

Table tennis

Mongolia entered two athletes into the table tennis competition for the first time at the Games. Enkhbatyn Lkhagvasüren and Batmönkhiin Bolor-Erdene scored their zonal-match triumphs for East Asia to book a spot each in the men's and women's singles at the Asian Qualification Tournament in Doha, Qatar.

Weightlifting

Mongolia entered one female weightlifter into the Olympic competition. Erdenebatyn Bilegsaikhan topped the list of weightlifters from Asia in the women's +87 kg category based on the IWF Absolute Continental Rankings.

Wrestling

Mongolia qualified nine wrestlers for each of the following classes into the Olympic competition. Two of them finished among the top six to book Olympic spots in the men's freestyle 65 kg and women's freestyle 68 kg at the 2019 World Championships, while five additional licenses were awarded to the Mongolian wrestlers, who progressed to the top two finals of their respective weight categories at the 2021 Asian Qualification Tournament in Almaty, Kazakhstan. Two Mongolian wrestlers claimed one of the remaining slots each in the men's freestyle 57 kg and women's freestyle 62 kg, respectively, to complete the nation's roster at the 2021 World Qualification Tournament in Sofia, Bulgaria.

Freestyle

References

Nations at the 2020 Summer Olympics
2020
2021 in Mongolian sport